Sherlock Holmes is a character created by Sir Arthur Conan Doyle.

Young Sherlock may refer to:

Film
Young Sherlock Holmes, a 1985 American mystery adventure film directed by Barry Levinson

Novels
Young Sherlock Holmes (books), a young adult book series by Andy Lane

Television
Young Sherlock: The Mystery of the Manor House, an 8-episode television series produced by Granada Television 
Young Sherlock (Chinese TV series), a 2014 Chinese television series about detective Di Renjie